The String Quartet in E-flat major was composed by Johann Baptist Wanhal around 1785, like Mozart's D major String Quartet K. 499, the composition was dedicated to Franz Anton Hoffmeister and has become known by the nickname Hoffmeister Nº. 2.

Structure

The composition is in three movements:

 Allegro con fuoco
 Adagio
 Allegro

See also

 String Quartet No. 20 (Mozart)

External links

Compositions by Johann Baptist Wanhal
Wanhal
Compositions in E-flat major
1785 compositions